The 1992 Buenos Aires Grand Prix was a motor race held at Buenos Aires on December 13, 1992, in the Autódromo Oscar Alfredo Gálvez.

It was titled the World Cup Formula 3000 and was a one-off non-championship event. While most of the field was comprised by teams from the 1992 International Formula 3000 season, the field of 20 drivers was primarily a mix of F3000, British Formula 2 and Formula 3 Sudamericana drivers, along with a handful of drivers from junior European formula.

Classification

External links
Temporada (World Cup) - Buenos Aires (RA), December 13th 1992 (Archived 2009-10-21)
( Archived 2009-10)
(Non-Championship-Races)

 

Buenos Aires Grand Prix
Buenos Aires Grand Prix
1992 in Argentine motorsport
December 1992 sports events in South America
Formula 3000